The 1991 U.S. Open was the 91st U.S. Open, held June 13–17 at Hazeltine National Golf Club in Chaska, Minnesota, a suburb southwest of Minneapolis. Payne Stewart defeated 1987 champion Scott Simpson in an 18-hole Monday playoff to win the first of his two U.S. Open titles. It was the second of Stewart's three major championships.

Stewart held the lead through each of the first three rounds, but in the final round he found himself trailing Simpson by a stroke heading to the 18th. Simpson hit his drive into the rough and could only manage a bogey to Stewart's par, forcing an 18-hole playoff. Both players shot a final-round 72 to finish at 282 total, three shots clear of Larry Nelson and Fred Couples. In the playoff, Simpson led by two-strokes heading to the 16th. He then bogeyed the hole, however, while Stewart made birdie to even up the contest. At the par-3 17th, Simpson found the water on his tee shot and recorded another bogey, giving Stewart a one-shot advantage. Simpson then made bogey on the 18th while Stewart made a par, giving Stewart a two-stroke win and the championship. Stewart's winning score in the playoff of 75 was the highest since Tommy Armour won with a 76 in 1927.

Play was interrupted during the first round due to a severe thunderstorm. Six people were struck by lightning while seeking shelter near the 11th tee, and one person was killed.

It was the final U.S. Open appearance for two-time champion Lee Trevino; Phil Mickelson won low-amateur honors for the second consecutive year, finishing in 55th place.

This was the second U.S. Open at Hazeltine; the first was in 1970. It later hosted the PGA Championship in 2002 and 2009.

Course layout

Source:
Previous course length for major championships
  - par 72, 1970 U.S. Open

Past champions in the field

Made the cut

Missed the cut

Source:

Round summaries

First round
Thursday, June 13, 1991

Second round
Friday, June 14, 1991

Amateurs: Mickelson (+1), Doyle (+6), Gorgone (+7), Lee (+14).

Third round
Saturday, June 15, 1991

Final round
Sunday, June 16, 1991

Amateur: Phil Mickelson (+12)

Source:

Scorecard
Final round

Cumulative tournament scores, relative to par

Source:

Playoff
Monday, June 17, 1991

Scorecard

Cumulative playoff scores, relative to par
{|class="wikitable" span = 50 style="font-size:85%;
|-
|style="background: Pink;" width=10|
|Birdie
|style="background: PaleGreen;" width=10|
|Bogey
|}
Source:

References

External links
USGA Championship Database

U.S. Open (golf)
Golf in Minnesota
U.S. Open
U.S. Open (golf)
U.S. Open
U.S. Open (golf)